Mozgov is a Russian surname meaning "brains".  Notable people with the surname include:

Sergei Mozgov (born 1995), Russian ice dancer
Timofey Mozgov (born 1986), Russian basketball player who plays in the National Basketball Association

Russian-language surnames